Jaghin District is a district (bakhsh) in Rudan County, Hormozgan Province, Iran. At the 2006 census, its population was 11,254, in 2,329 families.  The District has no cities.  The District has two rural districts (dehestan): Jaghin-e Jonubi Rural District and Jaghin-e Shomali Rural District.

References 

Districts of Hormozgan Province
Rudan County